House of Hancock is an Australian mini-series, part 1 aired on the Nine Network on 8 February 2015 and the 2nd part on 15 February.

Plot 
House of Hancock tells the fictionalised story of the Hancock dynasty and the bizarre love triangle that emerged between Lang, his daughter Gina, and his beautiful Filipina housekeeper Rose.

Lang and Gina are inseparable, the perfect team, and Gina is confident she will soon inherit the family business. But their relationship is rocked by a series of tumultuous events. First, Lang is furious when Gina marries a man old enough to be her father. Then Lang's beloved wife Hope dies. In an attempt to help her ailing father, Gina employs a new housekeeper to get him back on track, Rose Lacson from the Philippines, not realising this will be a decision that tears their family apart.

Lang is instantly smitten with the vivacious Rose, 37 years younger than the ageing iron ore magnate. Is it real love? Or has the housekeeper snagged the richest man in Australia? Lang and Rose quickly marry and what follows is an increasingly bitter public feud lasting two decades: filled with forbidden love, murder accusations, drug charges, illegitimate children, court cases and epic betrayal, all played out in the media, and all for Gina to retain control over the staggering Hancock family fortune.

Production 

On 13 February 2013, it was confirmed that a series, titled Gina, consisting of four, one-hour telemovies based on the life of mining magnate, Gina Rinehart was commissioned in a joint venture between the Nine Network, Cordell Jigsaw Zapruder and Claudia Karvan's production company.

In November 2013, the Nine Network confirmed that the drama had been cut to half its original size and had a new name, presenting it as a two, one-hour telemovies, titled Gina v Rose: The House of Hancock.

On 13 August 2014, it was announced that Mandy McElhinney had won the titular role of Gina Rinehart, with news breaking four days later that Sam Neill and Peta Sergeant had signed on to play Lang Hancock and Rose Hancock Porteous, respectively.

The telemovie is produced by Michael Cordell, Claudia Karvan and Paul Bennett.

Filming for House of Hancock took place in Perth and Sydney, which began in August 2014 and wrapped six weeks later in early October 2014.

Cast and characters
 Mandy McElhinney as Gina Rinehart
 Sam Neill as Lang Hancock
 Peta Sergeant as Rose Hancock Porteous
 Robert Coleby as Frank Rinehart

Reception 
The first episode aired on 8 February 2015 at 8:45 on the Nine Network, against Ten’s NCIS: New Orleans. The Telemovie is split into two parts shown over two Sundays.

Awards and nominations

Controversy
Controversy over House of Hancock being defamatory has been a worry of Gina Rinehart since it premiered on the Nine Network. Rinehart has accused the show of being incorrect. Since then, Gina Rinehart has taken legal action, for which her lawyers have been contacted about this defamatory and tried to stop part 2 from airing. On 24 February 2017 the Nine Network forced to release a carefully worded apology to Gina Rinehart for its inaccuracies and agreed not to release the TV series again on DVD, stream or sell it overseas.

References

2015 Australian television series debuts
Australian drama television series
2010s Australian television miniseries
Nine Network original programming
2015 Australian television series endings